Ghetto Warfare is a compilation album by the rap duo M.O.P. It was released on July 25, 2006 but had been recorded several years before (between 2001–2003) while the group was signed to Roc-A-Fella. The album was shelved and released later by Coppertop Records, a small indie label.

Track listing
 "Intro" – 0:58
 "Welcome Back" (featuring Teflon) – 1:28
 "Roc La Familia" (featuring Jay-Z, Memphis Bleek & State Property) – 3:46
 "Instigator" (featuring Teflon) – 3:54*  (Produced by  9th Wonder)
 "Interlude" – 1:11
 "Fuck M.O.P." – 3:24***
 "Stompdashitoutu" (featuring Capone-N-Noreaga) – 3:01**  (Produced by Tony Pizarro)
 "Interlude" – 2:14
 "Fire" – 4:48  (Produced by DR Period)
 "Got to Go" – 3:47***
 "The Bottom" – 5:07
 "Put It in the Air" (featuring Jay-Z) – 4:05****  (Produced by Fizzy Womack, Laze E Laze)
 "What the Fuck" – 4:18***
 "Wanna Be Gs" – 4:38*****  (Produced by M.O.P.)
 "Live from Ground Zero" – 4:19  (Produced by  Ill Will Fulton)
 "Take a Minute" – 3:00****  (Produced by Kouch)
 "Muddy Waters" – 4:14****  (Produced by Tommy Tee)
 "G-Boy Stance" – 4:15***  (Produced by DR Period)
 "BKNY" – 4:29*  (Produced by Heatmakerz)

       * previously released on Code of the Streets
     ** previously released on Cradle 2 the Grave soundtrack
 *** previously released on Marxmen Cinema
   **** previously released on St. Marxmen
 ***** previously released on Bad Boys II soundtrack

References

External links 
 

M.O.P. albums
Albums produced by DJ Premier
Albums produced by 9th Wonder
Hip hop compilation albums
2006 compilation albums